MESSENGER was a NASA robotic space probe that orbited the planet Mercury between 2011 and 2015, studying Mercury's chemical composition, geology, and magnetic field.  The name is a backronym for "Mercury Surface, Space Environment, Geochemistry, and Ranging", and a reference to the messenger god Mercury from Roman mythology.

MESSENGER was launched aboard a Delta II rocket in August 2004.  Its path involved a complex series of flybys – the spacecraft flew by Earth once, Venus twice, and Mercury itself three times, allowing it to decelerate relative to Mercury using minimal fuel. During its first flyby of Mercury in January 2008, MESSENGER became the second mission, after Mariner 10 in 1975, to reach Mercury.

MESSENGER entered orbit around Mercury on March 18, 2011, becoming the first spacecraft to do so. It successfully completed its primary mission in 2012. Following two mission extensions, the spacecraft used the last of its maneuvering propellant to deorbit, impacting the surface of Mercury on April 30, 2015.

Mission overview 
MESSENGERs formal data collection mission began on April 4, 2011. The primary mission was completed on March 17, 2012, having collected close to 100,000 images. MESSENGER achieved 100% mapping of Mercury on March 6, 2013, and completed its first year-long extended mission on March 17, 2013. The probe's second extended mission lasted for over two years, but as its low orbit degraded, it required reboosts to avoid impact. It conducted its final reboost burns on October 24, 2014, and January 21, 2015, before crashing into Mercury on April 30, 2015.

During its stay in Mercury orbit, the probe's instruments yielded significant data, including a characterization of Mercury's magnetic field and the discovery of water ice at the planet's north pole, which had long been suspected on the basis of Earth-based radar data.

Mission background

Previous missions
In 1973, Mariner 10 was launched by NASA to make multiple flyby encounters of Venus and Mercury. Mariner 10 provided the first detailed data of Mercury, mapping 40–45% of the surface. Mariner 10's final flyby of Mercury occurred on March 16, 1975. No subsequent close-range observations of the planet would take place for more than 30 years.

Proposals for the mission
In 1998, a study detailed a proposed mission to send an orbiting spacecraft to Mercury, as the planet was at that point the least-explored of the inner planets. In the years following the Mariner 10 mission, subsequent mission proposals to revisit Mercury had appeared too costly, requiring large quantities of propellant and a heavy lift launch vehicle. Moreover, inserting a spacecraft into orbit around Mercury is difficult, because a probe approaching on a direct path from Earth would be accelerated by the Sun's gravity and pass Mercury far too quickly to orbit it. However, using a trajectory designed by Chen-wan Yen in 1985, the study showed it was possible to seek a Discovery-class mission by using multiple, consecutive gravity assist, 'swingby' maneuvers around Venus and Mercury, in combination with minor propulsive trajectory corrections, to gradually slow the spacecraft and thereby minimize propellant needs.

Objectives
The MESSENGER mission was designed to study the characteristics and environment of Mercury from orbit. Specifically, the scientific objectives of the mission were:
 to characterize the chemical composition of Mercury's surface.
 to study the planet's geologic history.
 to elucidate the nature of the global magnetic field (magnetosphere). 
 to determine the size and state of the core.
 to determine the volatile inventory at the poles.
 to study the nature of Mercury's exosphere.

Spacecraft design

The MESSENGER spacecraft was designed and built at the Johns Hopkins University Applied Physics Laboratory. Science operations were managed by Sean Solomon as principal investigator, and mission operations were also conducted at JHU/APL. MESSENGER's total mission cost, including the cost of the spacecraft's construction, was estimated at under US$450 million.

Attitude control and propulsion
Main propulsion was provided by the 645 N, 317 sec. Isp bipropellant (hydrazine and nitrogen tetroxide) large velocity assist (LVA) thruster. The model used was the LEROS 1b, developed and manufactured at AMPAC‐ISP's Westcott works, in the United Kingdom. The spacecraft was designed to carry  of propellant and helium pressurizer for the LVA.

Four  monopropellant thrusters provided spacecraft steering during main thruster burns, and twelve  monopropellant thrusters were used for attitude control. For precision attitude control, a reaction wheel attitude control system was also included. Information for attitude control was provided by star trackers, an inertial measurement unit and six sun sensors.

Communications

The probe included two small deep space transponders for communications with the Deep Space Network and three kinds of antennas: a high gain phased array whose main beam could be electronically steered in one plane, a medium-gain "fan-beam" antenna and a low gain horn with a broad pattern. The high gain antenna was used as transmit-only at 8.4 GHz, the medium-gain and low gain antennas transmit at 8.4 GHz and receive at 7.2 GHz, and all three antennas operate with right-hand circularly polarized (RHCP) radiation. One of each of these antennas was mounted on the front of the probe facing the Sun, and one of each was mounted to the back of the probe facing away from the Sun.

Power

The space probe was powered by a two-panel gallium arsenide/germanium solar array providing an average of 450 watts while in Mercury orbit. Each panel was rotatable and included optical solar reflectors to balance the temperature of the array. Power was stored in a common-pressure-vessel, 23-ampere-hour nickel–hydrogen battery, with 11 vessels and two cells per vessel.

Computer and software

The spacecraft's onboard computer system was contained in an Integrated Electronics Module (IEM), a device that combined core avionics into a single box. The computer featured two radiation-hardened IBM RAD6000s, a 25 megahertz main processor, and a 10 MHz fault protection processor. For redundancy, the spacecraft carried a pair of identical IEMs. For data storage, the spacecraft carried two solid-state recorders able to store up to one gigabyte each. The IBM RAD6000 main processor collected, compressed, and stored data from MESSENGER's instruments for later playback to Earth.

MESSENGER used a software suite called SciBox to simulate its orbit and instruments, in order to "choreograph the complicated process of maximizing the scientific return from the mission and minimizing conflicts between instrument observations, while at the same time meeting all spacecraft constraints on pointing, data downlink rates, and onboard data storage capacity."

Scientific instruments

Mercury Dual Imaging System (MDIS) 

Included two CCD cameras, a narrow-angle camera (NAC) and a wide-angle camera (WAC) mounted to a pivoting platform. Color imaging was possible only with the narrow-band filter wheel attached to the wide-angle camera.

Objectives:
Flyby Phase:
 Acquisition of near-global coverage at ≈.
 Multispectral mapping at ≈.
 Orbital Phase:
 A 25°-off-nadir mosaic to complement the nadir-looking mosaic for global stereo mapping.
 Completion of the multispectral mapping begun during the flybys.
 High-resolution image strips across features representative of major geologic units and structures.

Principal investigator: Scott Murchie / Johns Hopkins University 
Data: PDS/MODE narrow-angle catalog, PDS/MODE wide-angle catalog, PDS/PIN data catalog

Gamma-Ray Spectrometer (GRS) 

Measured gamma-ray emissions from the surface of Mercury to determine the planet's composition by detecting certain elements (oxygen, silicon, sulfur, iron, hydrogen, potassium, thorium, uranium) to a depth of 10 cm.

Objectives:

 Provide surface abundances of major elements.
 Provide surface abundances of Fe, Si, and K, infer alkali depletion from K abundances, and provide abundance limits on H (water ice) and S (if present) at the poles.
 Map surface element abundances where possible, and otherwise provide surface-averaged abundances or establish upper limits.

Principal investigator: William Boynton / University of Arizona 
Data: PDS/GSN data catalog, PDS/MODE GRS data catalog

Neutron Spectrometer (NS) 

Determined the hydrogen mineral composition to a depth of 40 cm by detecting low-energy neutrons resulting from the collision of cosmic rays with the minerals.

Objectives:

 Establish and map the abundance of hydrogen over most of the northern hemisphere of Mercury.
 Investigate the possible presence of water ice within and near permanently shaded craters near the north pole.
 Provide secondary evidence to aid in interpreting GRS measured gamma-ray line strengths in terms of elemental abundances.
 Outline surface domains at the base of both northern and southern cusps of the magnetosphere where the solar wind can implant hydrogen in surface material.

Principal investigator: William Boynton / University of Arizona
Data: PDS/GSN data catalog,  PDS/MODE NS data catalog

X-Ray Spectrometer (XRS) 

Mapped mineral composition within the top millimeter of the surface on Mercury by detecting X-ray spectral lines from magnesium, aluminum, sulphur, calcium, titanium, and iron, in the 1–10 keV range.

Objectives:
 Determine the history of the formation of Mercury
 Characterize the composition of surface elements by measuring the X-ray emissions induced by the incident solar flux.

Principal investigator: George Ho / APL 
Data: PDS/GSN data catalog, PDS/MODE data catalog

Magnetometer (MAG) 

Measured the magnetic field around Mercury in detail to determine the strength and average position of the field.

Objectives:
 Investigate the structure of Mercury's magnetic field and its interaction with the solar wind.
 Characterize the geometry and time variability of the magnetospheric field.
 Detect wave-particle interactions with the magnetosphere.
 Observe magnetotail dynamics, including phenomena possibly analogous to substorms in the Earth's magnetosphere.
 Characterize the magnetopause structure and dynamics.
 Characterize field-aligned currents that link the planet with the magnetosphere.

Principal investigator: Mario Acuna / NASA Goddard Space Flight Center 
Data: PDS/PPI data catalog

Mercury Laser Altimeter (MLA) 

Provided detailed information regarding the height of landforms on the surface of Mercury by detecting the light of an infrared laser as the light bounced off the surface. 

Objectives:
 Provide a high-precision topographic map of the high northern latitude regions.
 Measure the long-wavelength topographic features at mid-to-low northern latitudes.
 Determine topographic profiles across major geologic features in the northern hemisphere.
 Detect and quantify the planet's forced physical librations by tracking the motion of large-scale topographic features as a function of time.
 Measure the surface reflectivity of Mercury at the MLA operating wavelength of 1,064 nanometers.

Principal investigator: David Smith / GSFC 
Data: PDS/GSN data catalog, PDS/MODE data catalog

Mercury Atmospheric and Surface Composition Spectrometer (MASCS) 

Determined the characteristics of the tenuous atmosphere surrounding Mercury by measuring ultraviolet light emissions, and ascertained the prevalence of iron and titanium minerals on the surface by measuring the reflectance of infrared light.

Objectives:
 Characterize the composition, structure, and temporal behavior of the exosphere.
 Investigate the processes that generate and maintain the exosphere.
 Determine the relationship between exospheric and surface composition.
 Search for polar deposits of volatile material, and determine how are the accumulation of these deposits are related to exospheric processes.

Principal investigator: William McClintock / University of Colorado
Data: PDS/GSN data catalog, PDS/MODE data catalog

Energetic Particle and Plasma Spectrometer (EPPS) 

Measured the charged particles in the magnetosphere around Mercury using an energetic particle spectrometer (EPS) and the charged particles that come from the surface using a fast imaging plasma spectrometer (FIPS).

Objectives:
 Determine the structure of the planet's magnetic field.
 Characterize exosphere neutrals and accelerated magnetospheric ions.
 Determine the composition of the radar-reflective materialmaterials gyms at Mercury's poles.
 Determine the electrical properties of the crust/atmosphere/environment interface.
 Determine characteristics of the dynamics of Mercury's magnetosphere and their relationships to external drivers and their internal conditions.
 Measure interplanetary plasma properties in cruise and in Mercury vicinity.

Principal investigator: Barry Mauk / APL 
Data: PDS/PPI data catalog

Radio Science (RS) 
Measured the gravity of Mercury and the state of the planetary core by utilizing the spacecraft's positioning data.

Objectives:
 Determine the position of the spacecraft during both the cruise and orbital phases of the mission.
 Observe gravitational perturbations from Mercury to investigate the spatial variations of density within the planet's interior, and a time-varying component in Mercury's gravity to quantify the amplitude of Mercury's libration.
 Provide precise measurements of the range of the MESSENGER spacecraft to the surface of Mercury for determining proper altitude mapping with the MLA.

Principal investigator: David Smith / NASA Goddard Space Flight Center 
Data: PDS/GSN data catalog, PDS/MODE data catalog

Mission profile

Launch and trajectory
The MESSENGER probe was launched on August 3, 2004, at 06:15:56 UTC by NASA from Space Launch Complex 17B at the Cape Canaveral Air Force Station in Florida, aboard a Delta II 7925 launch vehicle. The complete burn sequence lasted 57 minutes bringing the spacecraft into a heliocentric orbit, with a final velocity of 10.68 km/s (6.64 miles/s) and sending the probe into a 7.9 billion-kilometer (4.9 billion mi) trajectory that took 6 years, 7 months and 16 days before its orbital insertion on March 18, 2011.

Traveling to Mercury and entering orbit requires an extremely large velocity change (see delta-v) because Mercury's orbit is deep in the Sun's gravity well.  On a direct course from Earth to Mercury, a spacecraft is constantly accelerated as it falls toward the Sun, and will arrive at Mercury with a velocity too high to achieve orbit without excessive use of fuel. For planets with an atmosphere, such as Venus and Mars, spacecraft can minimize their fuel consumption upon arrival by using friction with the atmosphere to enter orbit (aerocapture), or can briefly fire their rocket engines to enter into orbit followed by a reduction of the orbit by aerobraking. However, the tenuous atmosphere of Mercury is far too thin for these maneuvers.  Instead, MESSENGER extensively used gravity assist maneuvers at Earth, Venus, and Mercury to reduce the speed relative to Mercury, then used its large rocket engine to enter into an elliptical orbit around the planet.  The multi-flyby process greatly reduced the amount of propellant necessary to slow the spacecraft, but at the cost of prolonging the trip by many years and to a total distance of 7.9 billion kilometers (4.9 billion miles).

Several planned thruster firings en route to Mercury were unnecessary, because these fine course adjustments were performed using solar radiation pressure acting on MESSENGER's solar panels. To further minimize the amount of necessary propellant, the spacecraft orbital insertion targeted a highly elliptical orbit around Mercury.

The elongated orbit had two other benefits:  It allowed the spacecraft time to cool after the times it was between the hot surface of Mercury and the Sun, and also it allowed the spacecraft to measure the effects of solar wind and the magnetic fields of the planet at various distances while still allowing close-up measurements and photographs of the surface and exosphere.
The spacecraft was originally scheduled to launch during a 12-day window that beginning May 11, 2004. On March 26, 2004, NASA announced the launch would be moved to a later, 15-day launch window beginning July 30, 2004, to allow for further testing of the spacecraft. This change significantly altered the trajectory of the mission and delayed the arrival at Mercury by two years. The original plan called for three fly-by maneuvers past Venus, with Mercury orbit insertion scheduled for 2009. The trajectory was changed to include one Earth flyby, two Venus flybys, and three Mercury flybys before orbit insertion on March 18, 2011.

Earth flyby

MESSENGER performed an Earth flyby one year after launch, on August 2, 2005, with the closest approach at 19:13 UTC at an altitude of 2,347 kilometers (1,458 statute miles) over central Mongolia. On December 12, 2005, a 524-second-long burn (Deep-Space Maneuver or DSM-1) of the large thruster adjusted the trajectory for the upcoming Venus flyby by 316 m/s.

During the Earth flyby, the MESSENGER team imaged the Earth and Moon using MDIS and checked the status of several other instruments observing the atmospheric and surface compositions and testing the magnetosphere and determining that all instruments tested were working as expected. This calibration period was intended to ensure accurate interpretation of data when the spacecraft entered orbit around Mercury. Ensuring that the instruments functioned correctly at such an early stage in the mission allowed opportunity for multiple minor errors to be dealt with.

The Earth flyby was used to investigate the flyby anomaly, where some spacecraft have been observed to have trajectories that differ slightly from those predicted.  However no anomaly was observed in MESSENGER's flyby.

Two Venus flybys

During the encounter, MESSENGER passed behind Venus and entered superior conjunction, a period when Earth was on the exact opposite side of the Solar System, with the Sun inhibiting radio contact. For this reason, no scientific observations were conducted during the flyby. Communication with the spacecraft was reestablished in late November and performed a deep space maneuver on December 12, to correct the trajectory to encounter Venus in a second flyby.

During the encounter, all instruments were used to observe Venus and prepare for the following Mercury encounters. The encounter provided visible and near-infrared imaging data of the upper atmosphere of Venus. Ultraviolet and X-ray spectrometry of the upper atmosphere were also recorded, to characterize the composition. The ESA's Venus Express was also orbiting during the encounter, providing the first opportunity for simultaneous measurement of particle-and-field characteristics of the planet.

Three Mercury flybys

MESSENGER made a flyby of Mercury on January 14, 2008 (making its closest approach of 200 km above the surface of Mercury at 19:04:39 UTC), followed by a second flyby on October 6, 2008. MESSENGER executed a final flyby on September 29, 2009, further slowing down the spacecraft. Sometime during the closest approach of the last flyby, the spacecraft entered safe mode. Although this had no effect on the trajectory necessary for later orbit insertion, it resulted in the loss of science data and images that were planned for the outbound leg of the fly-by. The spacecraft had fully recovered by about seven hours later. One last deep space maneuver, DSM-5, was executed on November 24, 2009, at 22:45 UTC to provide the required  velocity change for the scheduled Mercury orbit insertion on March 18, 2011, marking the beginning of the orbital mission.

Orbital insertion
The thruster maneuver to insert the probe into Mercury's orbit began at 00:45 UTC on March 18, 2011. The 0.9 km/s (0.5 mi./sec.) braking maneuver lasted about 15 minutes, with confirmation that the craft was in Mercury orbit received at 01:10 UTC on March 18 (9:10 PM, March 17 EDT). Mission lead engineer Eric Finnegan indicated that the spacecraft had achieved a near-perfect orbit.

This orbit was chosen to shield the probe from the heat radiated by Mercury's hot surface. Only a small portion of each orbit was at a low altitude, where the spacecraft was subjected to radiative heating from the hot side of the planet.

Primary science
After MESSENGER'''s orbital insertion, an eighteen-day commissioning phase took place. The supervising personnel switched on and tested the craft's science instruments to ensure they had completed the journey without damage. The commissioning phase "demonstrated that the spacecraft and payload [were] all operating nominally, notwithstanding Mercury's challenging environment."

The primary mission began as planned on April 4, 2011, with MESSENGER orbiting Mercury once every twelve hours for an intended duration of twelve Earth months, the equivalent of two solar days on Mercury. Principal Investigator Sean Solomon, then of the Carnegie Institution of Washington, said: "With the beginning today of the primary science phase of the mission, we will be making nearly continuous observations that will allow us to gain the first global perspective on the innermost planet. Moreover, as solar activity steadily increases, we will have a front-row seat on the most dynamic magnetosphere–atmosphere system in the Solar System."

On October 5, 2011, the scientific results obtained by MESSENGER during its first six terrestrial months in Mercury's orbit were presented in a series of papers at the European Planetary Science Congress in Nantes, France. Among the discoveries presented were the unexpectedly high concentrations of magnesium and calcium found on Mercury's nightside, and the fact that Mercury's magnetic field is offset far to the north of the planet's center.

Extended mission
In November 2011, NASA announced that the MESSENGER mission would be extended by one year, allowing the spacecraft to observe the 2012 solar maximum. Its extended mission began on March 17, 2012, and continued until March 17, 2013. Between April 16 and 20, 2012, MESSENGER carried out a series of thruster manoeuvres, placing it in an eight-hour orbit to conduct further scans of Mercury.

In November 2012, NASA reported that MESSENGER had discovered both water ice and organic compounds in permanently shadowed craters in Mercury's north pole. In February 2013, NASA published the most detailed and accurate 3D map of Mercury to date, assembled from thousands of images taken by MESSENGER. MESSENGER completed its first extended mission on March 17, 2013, and its second lasted until April 2015. In November 2013, MESSENGER was among the numerous space assets that imaged Comet Encke (2P/Encke) and Comet ISON (C/2012 S1). As its orbit began to decay in early 2015, MESSENGER was able to take highly detailed close-up photographs of ice-filled craters and other landforms at Mercury's north pole.  After the mission was completed, review of the radio ranging data provided the first measurement of the rate of mass loss from the Sun.

Discovery of water, organic compounds and volcanism
On July 3, 2008, the MESSENGER team announced that the probe had discovered large amounts of water present in Mercury's exosphere, which was an unexpected finding. In the later years of its mission, MESSENGER also provided visual evidence of past volcanic activity on the surface of Mercury, as well as evidence for a liquid iron planetary core. The probe also constructed the most detailed and accurate maps of Mercury to date, and furthermore discovered carbon-containing organic compounds and water ice inside permanently shadowed craters near the north pole.

Solar System portrait

On February 18, 2011, a portrait of the Solar System was published on the MESSENGER website.  The mosaic contained 34 images, acquired by the MDIS instrument during November 2010.  All the planets were visible with the exception of Uranus and Neptune, due to their vast distances from the Sun. The MESSENGER "family portrait" was intended to be complementary to the Voyager family portrait, which was acquired from the outer Solar System by Voyager 1 on February 14, 1990.

End of mission
After running out of propellant for course adjustments, MESSENGER entered its expected terminal phase of orbital decay in late 2014. The spacecraft's operation was extended by several weeks by exploiting its remaining supply of helium gas, which was used to pressurize its propellant tanks, as reaction mass. MESSENGER continued studying Mercury during its decay period. The spacecraft crashed onto the surface of Mercury on April 30, 2015, at 3:26 p.m. The spacecraft was estimated to have impacted at 54.4° N, 149.9° W on Suisei Planitia, near the crater Janáček. The crash occurred at a place not visible from Earth at the time, and thus was not detected by any observers or instruments. NASA confirmed the end of the MESSENGER mission at 3:40 p.m. EDT (19:40 GMT) after NASA's Deep Space Network did not detect the spacecraft's reemergence from behind Mercury.[[File:PIA19449-PlanetMercury-MESSENGER-Images-First-20110329-Last-20150430.jpg|thumb|center|600px|{{center|MESSENGERs first (March 29, 2011) and last (April 30, 2015) images from Mercury's orbit (impact details).}}]]

 See also 

 BepiColombo'', a European-Japanese mission to Mercury which launched on October 19, 2018, and will enter orbit in December 2025
 Exploration of Mercury
 Mariner program
 Stamatios Krimigis, a NASA physicist and key contributor to the mission

References

External links 

JHUAPL homepage – official site at Johns Hopkins University Applied Physics Laboratory
MESSENGER Mission Page – official information regarding the mission on the NASA website
MESSENGER Mission Profile by NASA's Solar System Exploration
Mercury Flyby 1 Visualization Tool and Mercury Flyby 1 Actuals – comparison between simulated views of Mercury to the images actually acquired by MESSENGER during flyby 1
Mercury Flyby 2 Visualization Tool and Mercury Flyby 2 Actuals – comparison between simulated views of Mercury to the images actually acquired by MESSENGER during flyby 2
MESSENGER Image Gallery
NSSDC Master Catalog entry
Video from MESSENGER as it departs Earth
Mercury data collected by both Mariner 10 and MESSENGER
NASA Solar System 2015-04-27 MESSENGER at Mercury Images of the Mission

Space probes launched in 2004
Destroyed space probes
Discovery Program
NASA space probes
Missions to Mercury
Spacecraft launched by Delta II rockets
Orbiters (space probe)
Articles containing video clips